A Taste of Money is a 1960 British comedy film directed by Max Varnel and starring Jean Cadell, Dick Emery and Pete Murray. It was produced by the Danzigers.

Premise
An elderly spinster who works as a cashier for an insurance company plots to rob her employers by concocting the perfect crime.

Cast
Dick Emery - Morrissey
Jean Cadell - Miss Brill
Pete Murray - Dave
Ralph Michael - Superintendent White
Donald Eccles - Joe
C. Denier Warren - Tyler
John Bennett - Waiter
Robert Raglan - Simpson
Mark Singleton - Detective
Christina Gregg - Ruth
Derek Sydney - Barman

Critical reception
TV Guide called the film "an uninspired comedy," and noted, "Cadell, at 76 years of age, turns in a charming performance, but that alone cannot save the picture from mediocrity"; while Sky Movies wrote, "minor but amusing British comedy that's all the better for its coat of Technicolor. Character actress Jean Cadell is a joy in a rare leading role, and Dick Emery makes a perfect not-quite-funny gangster - his best work for the cinema. Christina Gregg is a pretty heroine in a film, which breaks little fresh ground, yet remains constantly entertaining thanks to good performances."

References

External links
A Taste of Money at BFI

1960 films
1960 comedy films
British comedy films
Films shot at New Elstree Studios
1960s English-language films
1960s British films